K181 or K-181 may refer to:

 K-181 (Kansas highway), a state highway in Kansas
 HMCS Sackville (K181)